Bernard Breslin (2 May 1874 – 10 November 1913) was a Scottish footballer who played as a right half for Hibernian and Scotland. Breslin was part of the Hibs teams that won the 1901–02 Scottish Cup and the Scottish league championship in 1903. He represented Scotland once, in 1897, and played four times for the Scottish League representative team between 1898 and 1900.

References

External links

1874 births
1913 deaths
Footballers from North Lanarkshire
Association football wing halves
Scottish footballers
Hibernian F.C. players
Scottish Football League players
Scottish Junior Football Association players
Scottish Football League representative players
Scotland international footballers